Beckham County can refer to:

 Beckham County, Kentucky
 Beckham County, Oklahoma

Both were named for J. C. W. Beckham, who served as Governor of Kentucky and as a member of the United States Senate from Kentucky.